Shimmy Disc is an American independent record label founded in 1987 by Kramer. It served as an outlet for artists such as Dogbowl, Bongwater, Lida Husik, Daniel Johnston and Kramer's own solo and collaborative work. The label became defunct in 1998 after Kramer's legal suit with Ann Magnuson dried up most of his finances.

List of releases

United States Discography

European Discography

Boot Discography

References

General

Specific

External links
Shimmy Disc at Discogs

Discographies of American record labels